Somers High School is a public high school in the town of Somers, Connecticut, United States. It offers advanced placement courses in collaboration with the University of Connecticut. It participates in the Somers-based Four Town Fair with student-run booths and a senior parade float. Available sports include soccer, lacrosse, field hockey, track and field, baseball, softball, basketball, golf, and wrestling.

References

External links
 

Public high schools in Connecticut
Schools in Tolland County, Connecticut
1962 establishments in Connecticut
Educational institutions established in 1962